Sacred Heart Boys' High School is a government aided high school for boys, affiliated to the Maharashtra Secondary School Certificate (SSC) Board. The staff is self centered and do not have any etiquette. It is located on S. V. Road in Santa Cruz (West), Mumbai, India. The school was founded by Father Alvarez in 1939. Students come from all surrounding society, partly encouraged by the low cost education provided by Catholic priests of the Bombay diocese. The school gives importance to all religions and customs. Landmarks near the school include the Willingdon Catholic Gymkhana, St. Teresa's Convent High School and Ramkrishna Mission hospital. Around 2000  students study in this school every year.

The Sacred Heart Church, a Victorian mid-sized Catholic church that caters to parish members of Santacruz (west) is located on same premises as the school. The church is built in the shape of a cross with mezzanine floors in the left and right arms. Stained glass windows adorn the church entrances. Towards the west gate of the campus and close to the church is a grotto frequented by people of all faiths.

Infrastructure
The school has two sections:
 Primary Section - Including  Jr. K.G., Sr. K.G. and 1st to 4th Standards
 Secondary section - Standards 5th to 10th.

The library can seat up to 20 students and is open during lunch breaks and up to 30 minutes after the school closes for the day.

The school has two Science laboratories accommodating 30 students at a time; one lab is on the second floor along with class rooms and the main auditorium while the other is next to the computer lab. Staff rooms are situated on the all floor of the old building and on the first floor of the new building.

The computer lab is situated near the school office. It can accommodate up to 30 students at a time

It has two auditoriums. The one in the main stone structure on the second floor where skits, plays elocution competitions and the likes are staged is referred to as the "School Hall",  The auditorium also hosts private wedding receptions, which are a source of revenue for the school. A baby grand piano can be found in the 2nd floor auditorium that is often used for school annual day functions. Another hall on the ground floor of the new school building referred to as "Primary hall" acts as a midday meal  serving place and is used for PTA meetings

The school has a 100 metre-long playground that is used for football, hockey, cricket, basketball and athletics. There is also a tarmac area in front of the old school building and adjacent to the playground, which, though not meant for hockey, basketball, etc., if often used for playing them.

The Parish house (Rectory) and office is situated between the main school building and the new school building. The school does not have a resident doctor or a trained paramedic in the campus but medical facilities are available within 200 meters of the school campus.

The school has an AV room situated on the second floor near the "School Hall". It can situate 70-75 students at a time.

The school will be launching the Sacred Heart International School, a co-ed school under the Cambridge International Curriculum from the 2016-17 academic year.

Activities
The school has a large play ground where it hosts its annual sporting event. Inter division football matches and mass drill are also conducted on the school grounds. The school ground, although not a public playground, is open for school children to play after school hours.

On Wednesdays, the school conducts mass drill for around 2000 students assemble for around half an hour. Every week the school band remove drums from the sports store room and set it up and beat it while the exercises are done. The school also conducts prayers on the stone ground on alternate days of week (except Saturday)
.

Principals
 Fr. Alvarez
 Fr. Rodrigues
 Fr. Bento
 Fr. T. Pereira
 Fr. Ferdinand Fonseca - Now Bishop Fredinand Fonseca  
 Fr. Richard Mathias
 Fr. Herculan Silvera
 Fr. Nereus Rodrigues 
 Fr. Rodney Esperance (famous for playing the National Anthem on the gramophone in his office at start of school. Also an avid sports person and enjoyed playing cricket and football with us).  
 Fr. Tony D'souza (Introduced a small prayer song at start of class after every break. Many of these were in Hindi).
 Fr. Felix Naronha (Suffered an untimely demise during his 1st year in the school, in 1995.)
 Fr. Milton Gonsalves
 Fr. Ivan Mascarenhas
 Fr. Abel Fernandez
 Fr. Thomson Kinny

Uniforms
The school uniform is a white, short-sleeved shirt, grey trousers and a maroon tie bearing two stripes that represent the 'house', i.e. red, yellow, blue or green. Class prefects and assistant prefects wear blue ties, without the descriptive colors. Socks are grey and shoes are black.

There is a used uniform bank operated by community groups in the school which collect clothes from  students who have outgrown them and give it to poorer students who cannot afford new uniform at the start of the year. Books and shoes are also shared this way.

After the arrival of Fr Thomson Kinney, a new design for the P.T uniform was bought for the kids It is colored according to their house color, with a logo of their school on the left upper chest and black pants. for the secondary section a black pant with strips according to the house color was made.

Notable alumni
 Manish Malhotra - Fashion designer
 Sunny Deol Bollywood actor
 Sameer Pitalwalla Businessman and National Award winning Producer 
 Vinod Mehra - Bollywood actor
 Ravi Chopra Bollywood Producer and Director B.R. Chopra Films
 Dinesh Vijan Bollywood Producer and Director
 Master Vikash Child actor

In popular media
Several Bollywood films have been shot on the school campus most notable being;

 Jagruti - 1953 - The football scene in the film was shot on campus.
 Coolie - 1983.
 Mr. India 1987, depicts Anil Kapoor receiving his two children featured in the first half. The scene was shot on the school premises during the lunch hour.
 Qayamat Se Qayamat Tak 1988 -  The start of the library scene was shot in front of the church adjoining the school campus.
 Khoon Bhari Maang 1988 -  where Aarti's (Rekha's) son was shown to be studying.
 Ishq Vishk 2003 - The school premises were used to depict a college.

Retired teachers
Mr Bhagwan Prasad Mishra (Hindi)
Mr Tulsidas Haridas Ashar (Maths and Science)
Mr Tiwari (History and Hindi)
Mr Awasthi (Hindi)
Mrs Usha Gautam
Mrs Nafisa Kagazwalla
Ms Ethel
Mr Louis Correa
Mr John Lopez
Mrs Veena Gulati
Mr Sawant Sr (PT)
Mr Sawant Jr (PT)
Mr Sebastian
Mr Alex Correa
Mrs Celine Pinto
Miss Celine Vaz (Her twin sister taught at St. Theresa's)
Mrs Cecelia Soares
Mrs Jane Lewis
Mrs Priya Navalkar
Mrs Pramilla Lewis
Mrs Lynette Menezes
Mrs Cecelia D'lima
Mrs Buddy Ubale
Mrs Kala Karnik
Mrs Sulana Vaz
Mr D'Mello (Drawing/Art) Known as Chota D'Mello to differentiate from the other D'Mello)
Mr D'Mello (Drawing/Art) Known as Bada D'Mello
    Chota and bada had more to do with teaching younger kids(Chota) and bigger kids(Bada),  but it also did match their physical statures
Mrs Betty Bayross
Mrs Pooja Jaisingh
Mrs Blanche Kaunds
Mrs Mayves Coelho (Maths)
Mrs. Naimpally
Mr Siddiqui
Miss Julie Vaz
Miss Gonsalves
Miss Athaide
Miss Naidu

References

Boys' schools in India
Catholic secondary schools in India
Primary schools in India
Christian schools in Maharashtra
High schools and secondary schools in Mumbai
Educational institutions established in 1946
1946 establishments in India